Lists of operas cover operas, a form of theatre in which music is essential, and the roles are portrayed by singers. There are general lists and lists by theme, country, medium and venue.

General
 List of operas by composer
 List of prominent operas
 List of operas by title

By theme

 List of operettas
 List of Christmas operas
 List of operas set in the Crusades 
 List of Orphean operas
 Science fiction opera

By country

 List of Argentine operas
 List of Mexican operas
 List of North Korean operas

By medium

 List of radio operas
 List of television operas

By venue

 Glyndebourne Festival Opera: history and repertoire, 1934–51
 Glyndebourne Festival Opera: history and repertoire, 1952–63
 List of Innsbruck Festival of Early Music productions
 List of performances of French grand operas at the Paris Opéra
 Salzburg Festival: history and repertoire, 1922–1926
 Salzburg Festival: history and repertoire, 1935–1937
 List of operas performed at the Santa Fe Opera
 List of works premiered at the Teatro Capranica
 Repertory of the Vienna Court Opera under Gustav Mahler
 List of operas performed at the Wexford Festival